Kamesha Hairston (born August 18, 1985, in Toledo, Ohio) is an American professional women's basketball player. In the 2007 and 2008 seasons she played for the Connecticut Sun. She retired from the game around 2014 due to injury. In 2019, she was inducted into the Philadelphia Big 5 Hall of Fame.

College career
Coached under WNBA player Dawn Staley, Hairston was the second scoring option in her first three years because of former Temple University and current Indiana Fever forward Candice Dupree. Hairston still had a good junior season, averaging 12.8 points per game. In the 2006–2007 season she was finally the star player of Temple University as she had a breakout year, averaging 18.9 points per game with 8.9 rebounds per game. In the 2007 Tournament, her final game was against Lindsey Harding, who led Duke, as Temple lost the game 62–52.

Temple statistics

Source

References 

1985 births
Living people
American women's basketball players
Basketball players from Ohio
Connecticut Sun draft picks
Connecticut Sun players
Small forwards
Sportspeople from Toledo, Ohio
Temple Owls women's basketball players